Inderjit Kaur Barthakur is an Indian civil servant, economist and writer. She is a member of the North Eastern Council (NEC), which carries the rank of a Minister of State of the Union government. She has published several books of poetry, stories and cuisine and So Full So Alive and Stories to Win the World are some of her notable works. She served as a secretary to the Government of India and was the president of the Indian Economics Association in 1990.

Awards and honours
She is the recipient of awards such as Mahila Shiromani Award (1989), International Women Award (1992), Bharat Jyoti Award (2008) and Indira Priyadarshini Award (2011). The Government of India awarded her the fourth highest civilian honour of the Padma Shri in 1992 and followed it up with the third highest honour of the Padma Bhushan in 2009.

References

External links 
 

Recipients of the Padma Shri in civil service
Recipients of the Padma Bhushan in civil service
Indian civil servants
Indian women economists
Indian women poets
Indian women short story writers
Year of birth missing (living people)
20th-century Indian short story writers
Women writers from Meghalaya
20th-century Indian poets
20th-century Indian economists
20th-century Indian women writers
Poets from Meghalaya
Women scientists from Meghalaya
21st-century Indian women scientists
21st-century Indian economists
21st-century Indian women writers
21st-century Indian writers
21st-century Indian poets
Living people